Hesperotestudo ("Western turtle") is an extinct genus of tortoise native to North and Central America (ranging as far south as Costa Rica) from the Early Miocene to the Late Pleistocene. Species of Hesperotesudo varied widely in size, with a large undescribed specimen from the Late Pleistocene of El Salvador reaching  in carapace length, larger than that of extant giant tortoises. Historically considered a subgenus of Geochelone, it is now considered to be distantly related to that genus. Its relationships with other tortoises are uncertain. The exposed areas of the bodies of Hesperotesudo species were extensively covered with large dermal ossicles, which in life were covered in keratin. It has been suggested that species of Hesperotestudo were relatively tolerant of cold weather. Hesperotestudo became extinct at the end of the Pleistocene and beginning of the Holocene co-incident with the arrival of the first humans in North America, and sites have been found where Hesperotestudo were butchered.

Taxonomy 
Species list is based on Vlachos, 2018
† Hesperotestudo Williams 1950
†Hesperotestudo bermudae Meylan and Sterrer 2000 Bermuda, Middle Pleistocene c. 310,000 years before present (YBP) - shell length c. 
†Hesperotestudo crassiscutata (Leidy 1889) Florida, Texas, Illinois, South Carolina, (possibly also El Salvador) Middle-Late Pleistocene shell length c. 
†Hesperotestudo ducateli (Collins and Lynn, 1936) Calvert Formation, Maryland, Middle Miocene (Langhian–Serravallian)
†Hesperotestudo gilbertii (Hay, 1899) Ogallala Formation, Kansas, Hemphillian, Late Miocene-Early Pliocene (Tortonian–Zanclean)
†Hesperotestudo orthopygia (Cope, 1878) (syn= Xerobates cyclopygius Cope, 1878 =Caryoderma snovianum Cope, 1886 = Testudo rexroadensis Oelrich, 1952 = Geochelone nordensis Holman, 1973) Kansas, California, Nebraska, Late Miocene-Pliocene shell length c. 
†Hesperotestudo osborniana (Hay, 1905)(syn= Testudo arenivaga Hay, 1906 = Testudo farri Hay, 1908 = Testudo impensa Hay, 1908 = Testudo orthopygia angusticeps Matthew, 1924) Colorado, Nebraska, Montana, Early Miocene-Early Pliocene shell length up to 
†Hesperotestudo turgida (Cope, 1892) (syn = Testudo incisa Hay, 1916a = Testudo riggsi Hibbard, 1944 = Testudo wilsoni Milstead, 1956 = Geochelone johnstoni Auffenberg 1962 = Geochelone alleni Auffenberg, 1966 = Geochelone oelrichi Holman, 1972a = Geochelone mlynarskii Auffenberg, 1988) Florida, Oklahoma, Kansas, Texas, Nebraska, Late Miocene-Late Pleistocene shell length c. 
†Hesperotestudo williamsi (Auffenberg, 1964) Oakville Formation, Texas, Early Miocene (Burdigalian) shell length c.

References 

Testudinidae
Miocene turtles
Pliocene turtles
Pleistocene turtles
Cenozoic reptiles of North America
Prehistoric turtle genera
Extinct turtles